Dear Friend is a 2022 Indian Malayalam-language thriller film directed by Vineeth Kumar and starring Tovino Thomas and Darshana Rajendran. The film released on 10 June 2022.

Plot 
The movie begins with a group of friends (Vinod, Jannath, Arjun, Shyam, Sajith and Amutha) celebrating Vinod’s birthday. As a prank, Vinod is forced to wear a homemade Superman costume while the friends parade around the city.

While celebrating in a club, Sajith and his friends get into a drunken altercation with somebody who was live-streaming Vinod in the Superman costume without his consent. This leads to the friends being apprehended by the police. The officer focuses on Vinod, mocking his tattoos (one of which reads ‘Mother’ in Malayalam). Vinod gets slapped by the interrogating officer for stepping out of line. Embarrassed by this, Vinod tells Jannath that this was his "most memorable birthday" and that he will pass it forward as revenge. 

The movie then shows the lives of the friends, their bonds, struggles, personal issues, estranged families, personal tragedies, and so on. Jannath struggles to be accepted by her father, who doesn’t approve of her relationship with Arjun; knowing that they won’t get his blessing, the pair have a courthouse wedding. Arjun, Vinod, Shyam, and Sajith are trying to secure financial backing for a health-based app that they are developing. While Shyam comes from wealth, he does not wish to carry on the family business of running a pub. Sajith is struggling financially and trying to support his family—his poor English and lack of social graces make it difficult for him to get any jobs, as he cannot do well in interviews. 

One night, the group are partying in a club. Vinod is not drinking alcohol, so Arjun spikes his drink. Vinod grows extremely angry, revealing that he abstained from drinking and smoking on this day as it is when his mother died many years ago. He leaves the club. Amutha follows him, and confesses that she loves him; however, Vinod does not reciprocate. 

Later, Vinod visits Jannath at the medical practise where she works, and confesses to having many unresolved feelings about the death of his mother. The two have a heartfelt conversation.

One day, as the friends are getting ready in the morning, they find that Vinod is missing and see he has left behind a letter proclaiming he doesn't want anyone to search for him and thanks them for the memories he had with them. Jannath initially thinks that this is a prank, and that Vinod is simply getting revenge for being humiliated on his birthday. However, the group is visited by police officers and taken in for questioning, and it becomes clear to Jannath that the matter is serious.

The police suspect Vinod of being a grifter, claiming that he has stolen 70 lakhs from a company he used to work at. The group are initially unable to believe this. They are divided; Jannath believes it must be a misunderstanding, and Shyam is enraged at being deceived by his alleged business partner. 

The group checked with the ad video and followed through and they found that Vinod is not responsible for creating some of the music that he claimed was his. They discover that many of the things he told them were lies. They went to Mumbai and met the original musician, Sreenath.  

Vinod and Sreenath was room mates. Sreenath's mother was suffering from Cancer. His mother passed away and Sreenath not able to handle this. Vinod motivates Sreenath in many ways and he registered Sreenath name in matrimonial. Suddenly, Vinod disappears and on the day of morning police came to Sreenath's place and enquired about 70 lakhs. 

The group came to that Vinod mother is alive, and due to Vinod disappearing from her life, she believes that he had died. 

The group, however, is still unable to find Vinod. They return home and carry on with their lives. Things are looking up for them: Jannath and Arjun are expecting a baby, Sajith secures a good job, and Shyam has taken over the family business. 

One day, Sajith spots Vinod parking a car on the street. He calls Jannath, Arjun, and Shyam. Shyam is too angry at Vinod to see him again, but Jannath and Arjun go with Sajith to the spot where he saw Vinod. They wait until nightfall for Vinod to appear again, and follow him to an apartment building. 

Sajith, Arjun, and Jannath confront Vinod about everything. He reveals that he left abruptly so as to evade the police, who are still actively looking for him. He also reveals that he lied about the death of his mother to discourage people from asking too many questions about his past. Jannath asks Vinod what lies he is currently telling about his identity; Vinod points to the ‘Mother’ tattoo on his arm, and says that the same story works every time.

Cast 
Tovino Thomas as Vinod
Darshana Rajendran as Jannath
Arjun Lal as Arjun
Basil Joseph as Sajith
Arjun Radhakrishnan as Shyam
Sanchana Natarajan as Amutha
Rekha as Vijayakumari Viswanathan
Vishak Nair as Shyam's brother

Production 
The film's story is inspired by actor Arjun Lal's experiences in Bengaluru.

Reception

Critical reception
Anna M. M. Vetticad of Firstpost wrote, “Dear Friend is matter of fact yet intriguing, and the finale is nicely open-ended. “ She ranked it tenth on her year-end list of best Malayalam films for the publication. Cris of The News Minute wrote that "But for the abruptness of the ending which makes you feel a little cheated, the film is a cosy and engaging watch". S. R. Praveen of The Hindu wrote that "Filmmaker Vineeth Kumar's second outing has an interesting premise, but what the film serves in the end — after all the painful work of building the suspense — is quite disappointing". Anjana George of The Times of India said that "Dear Friend is for those who cherish intimate friendships as an important part of the fabric of their life. Letting go, giving space and accepting individuals the way they are are also part of bonding". Sajin Srijith of The New Indian Express opined that "Dear Friend is one of those films that should inspire young aspiring filmmakers who think out of the box because this is a work that screams simplicity".

Box-office
The film only received nearly 64 lakhs from theatres. The film was a Box-office failure.

References

2022 films
2022 thriller drama films
Indian thriller drama films
2020s Malayalam-language films
Films about friendship
Films shot in Bangalore
Films scored by Justin Varghese